Urban Solitude is the second studio album by Dutch pop/rock singer Anouk. It was released in 1999. It yielded four singles: R U Kiddin' Me (#2), The Dark (#8), Michel (#3) and Don't, which peaked at number 13 in the Dutch chart. The album was certified platinum in the Netherlands, with 100.000 copies sold and gold in Belgium.

Track listing

"In The Sand"
"Don't"
"R U Kiddin' Me"
"Tom Waits"
"Urban Solitude"
"U Being U"
"Michel"
"The Dark"
"My Best Wasn't Good Enough" (featuring Dinand Woesthoff)
"It Wasn't Me"
"Cry"
"Body Brain"
"My Friend"

Personnel
 Artwork By [Sleeve Concept/ideas] – Anouk Teeuwe
 Co-producer – Ronald Trijber 
 Engineer – Ronald Trijber 
 Engineer [Assistant] – Frits Rosingh 
 Mastered By – Chris Bellman 
 Mixed By – Erwin Musper 
 Mixed By [Assistant] – Regula Mirz, Tracey Brown 
 Music By, Lyrics By – Anouk Teeuwe (tracks: 1 to 8, 10 to 13), Bart van Veen (tracks: 1 to 5, 7, 8, 10 to 13) 
 Photography – Frans Jansen 
 Producer – Anouk Teeuwe

References

Anouk (singer) albums
1999 albums